The 2006 Ladbrokes.com World Darts Championship was the 13th World Championship organised by the Professional Darts Corporation (PDC) since it separated from the British Darts Organisation (BDO). It was held from 19 December 2005 to 2 January 2006 at the Circus Tavern, Purfleet, Essex.

Format and qualifiers
A record field of 64 finalists assembled to battle for Phil Taylor's world crown. Play was not held between 22 December and Christmas Day due to the Christmas break. Play resumed on Boxing Day in the lead-up to the final. A day's break was also held on New Year's Eve for the New Year. Record prize money of £100,000 for the winner was on offer.

Despite the record field, there was a notable absentee. John Lowe's world ranking had fallen to a level which meant he was forced to qualify for the event – which he failed to do for the first time in his career. His run of 28 successive appearances (including the BDO World Championship) had come to an end. He was the last player to have appeared in a world championship each year since it began in 1978. Bob Anderson, who made his debut in 1984, now had the longest unbroken run – making his 23rd consecutive appearance for these championships.

A major shock came in the first round when world number one and top seed Colin Lloyd lost to Gary Welding – it was only the second time in the history of the PDC World Championship that the top seed fell in the first round (Peter Manley being the first in 2001). Welding, who had recovered from two sets down in his best-of-five-sets match against Lloyd, went on to reach the quarter-finals.

Phil Taylor became World Champion for the 13th time, this being his 11th PDC success. His toughest battle en route to the championship was a tight semi-final against Wayne Mardle which he managed to win by 6 sets to 5. The final was a more one-sided affair as Taylor overcame Peter Manley 7–0. It was Manley's third final defeat against Taylor and the second time he was whitewashed, mirroring the result of the 2002 final.

Order of Merit

Order of Merit

PDPA Qualifiers
  Andy Smith (third round)
  Steve Hine (first round)
  Steve Alker (third round)
  David Platt (first round)
  Jimmy Mann (first round)
  Geoff Wylie (first round)
  Wayne Jones (semi-finals)
  Dave Whitcombe (first round)
  Gary Welding (quarter-finals)
  Jason Clark (second round)
  Alan Tabern (second round)
  Dale Newton (first round)
  Kevin Spiolek (first round)
  Mark Salmon (first round)
  Dave Honey (first round)
  Andy Hamilton (third round)

International Qualifiers
  John Kuczynski (third round)
  Darin Young (first round)
  Ray Carver (second round)
  Ken Woods (first round)
  Gerry Convery (second round)
  Brian Roach (first round)
  Warren Parry (first round)
  John MaGowan (first round)
  Winston Cadogan (first round)
  Yasuhiko Matsunaga (first round)
  Chengan Liu (first round)
  Jan van der Rassel (second round)
  Erwin Extercatte (second round)
  Patrick Bulen (first round)
  Tomas Seyler (second round)
  Andree Welge (first round)

Prize money

Results

Representation from different countries
This table shows the number of players by country in the World Championship.

References

PDC World Darts Championships
PDC World Darts Championship 2006
PDC World Darts Championship 2006
PDC World Darts Championship
PDC World Darts Championship
PDC World Darts Championship
Purfleet
Sport in Essex